Mount Mackenzie King is a peak located in the Premier Range of the Cariboo Mountains in the east-central interior of British Columbia, Canada.  The mountain separates the Laurier Glacier to the north from the David Glacier to the south.

The name honours the tenth Prime Minister of Canada, William Lyon Mackenzie King, who died in 1950. The mountain was officially renamed after Mackenzie King in 1962. The mountain was originally referred to as Hostility Mountain by Don Munday in his 1925 ascent.

References

External links
 British Columbia Government Information Sheet for the Premier Range

Three-thousanders of British Columbia
Cariboo Mountains
Cariboo Land District